The discography of South Korean singer-songwriter Luna consists of one extended play, eighteen singles (including seven collaborations and six as a featured artist), and twenty-four soundtrack appearances.

Extended plays

Singles

As lead artist

As featured artist

Collaborations

Soundtrack appearances

Other appearances

Music videos

Notes

References

Discographies of South Korean artists
F(x) (group)